

Buildings and structures

Buildings
 1130
 Construction of Abbaye aux Dames, Caen, Normandy, completed (begun in 1062).
 Canterbury Cathedral, England, consecrated.
 Rochester Cathedral, England, consecrated.
 New west front of Église Notre-Dame la Grande, Poitiers, begun.
 about 1130
 Keep of Hedingham Castle, England, begun.
 Urnes Stave Church built in Norway.
 1131 – Cathedral of Cephalic begun.
 1132
 San Petro in Ciel d'Oro, Pavia, consecrated.
 San Giovanni deli Eremite in Palermo, Norman Kingdom of Sicily built.
 Fountains Abbey begun in England
 1133
 Rebuilding of Clairvaux Abbey begun.
 Construction of Angkor Wat begun.
 San Sisto, Pisa, Italy, consecrated.
 1135
 Basilica di San Zeno in Verona, Italy, rebuilt to its current form.
 Nave vault of Durham Cathedral, England, completed.
 1136
 Glasgow Cathedral in Scotland consecrated.
 Work begins on the narthex of the Basilique Saint-Denis in Saint-Denis, France.
 Reconstruction of the Great Mosque of Tlemcen in Almoravid Algeria
 1138 – San Paolo a Ripa d'Arno in Pisa, Italy, rebuilt to its current form.
 1139
 Verona Cathedral begun.
 Fontenay Abbey begun.
 about 1139 – Construction of Castle Rising in Norfolk, England, begins.

Births

Deaths

12th-century architecture
1130s works